Håkan Magnus Kahnberg (born 25 February 1980) is a Swedish former professional ice hockey right winger, who most notably played for Frölunda HC in Swedish Hockey League (SHL).

Kahnberg is a cousin of fellow Frölunda HC player Nicklas Lasu.

Playing career 
Kahnberg was eventually acquired by the St. Louis Blues and played for their American Hockey League affiliate the Peoria Rivermen in 2006 only to return to the Swedish league that same year. On 31 March 2009, Kahnberg signed a two-year contract with Brynäs IF. After two seasons with Brynäs, Kahnberg returned to Frölunda HC for the 2011–12 season.

Career statistics

Regular season and playoffs

International

Awards and honors

References

External links

1980 births
Brynäs IF players
Carolina Hurricanes draft picks
Frölunda HC players
Living people
Peoria Rivermen (AHL) players
Swedish ice hockey right wingers
Swedish expatriate ice hockey players in the United States